Xanthodisca ariel is a butterfly in the family Hesperiidae. It is found on Madagascar. The habitat consists of forests.

References

Erionotini
Butterflies of Africa
Lepidoptera of Madagascar
Butterflies described in 1878
Taxa named by Paul Mabille